Free fatty acid receptor 3 (FFA3) is a G-protein coupled receptor that in humans is encoded by the FFAR3 gene.

Animal studies 
Knockout mouse studies have implicated FFAR3 in diabetes, colitis, hypertension and asthma. However, discrepancies between the pathways activated by FFAR3 agonists in human cells and the equivalent murine counterparts have been observed.

Heteromerization 
FFAR3 may interact with FFAR2 to form a FFAR2-FFAR3 receptor heteromer with signalling that is distinct from the parent homomers.

See also 
 Free fatty acid receptor

References

Further reading 

 
 
 
 
 

G protein-coupled receptors